Bartolomé de Ledesma, O.P. (died February 16, 1604) was a Roman Catholic prelate who served as Bishop of Antequera, Oaxaca (1583–1604)
and Bishop of Panamá (1580–1583).

Biography
Bartolomé de Ledesma was born on February 16, 1604, in Salamanca, Spain and ordained a priest in the Order of Preachers.
On October 20, 1580, Pope Gregory XIII appointed him Bishop of Panamá (some sources state that he did not accept the nomination). On June 3, 1583, he was consecrated bishop by Diego de Romano y Govea, Bishop of Tlaxcala (Puebla de los Angeles). As there was no official governor during his term as bishop of Panama, he was instrumental in governing the province with the Audencia Real (high court). He reached out to the Cimarrónes (free blacks) who were living outside of the Crown's jurisdiction and facilitated their incorporation into the colony. In 1581, a treaty was signed between the Cimarrónes which gave them the land which they possessed and allowed them to found and settle the city of Pacora, near Panama City, as a commercial center. He also helped to lessen congestion in Panama City by founding the town of Penonomé and establishing parishes in Natá and  Olá. In June 1584, Pope Gregory XIII appointed him the third Bishop of Antequera, Oaxaca, where he served until his death on February 16, 1604.

References

External links and additional sources
 (for Chronology of Bishops) 
 (for Chronology of Bishops) 
 (for Chronology of Bishops) 
 (for Chronology of Bishops) 

1604 deaths
Bishops appointed by Pope Gregory XIII
Dominican bishops
People from Salamanca
16th-century Roman Catholic bishops in Mexico
17th-century Roman Catholic bishops in Mexico
16th-century Roman Catholic bishops in Panama
Roman Catholic bishops of Panamá